Agathactis is a genus of moths in the family Gelechiidae. It contains the species Agathactis toxocosma, which is found in Guyana.

The wingspan is 8–9 mm. The forewings are pale ochreous, sometimes tinged grey with a short oblique blackish mark from the base of the costa and a blackish dash on the costa before the middle, sometimes shaded grey beneath. There is a series of three blackish dashes along the fold more or less developed and a black dash more or less suffused grey in the disc beyond the middle, followed by another black dash whose apex meets a short inward projection from the centre of oblique blackish-grey lines from the costa and dorsum meeting in a curve, these lines are edged whitish anteriorly and preceded on the costa by a grey patch. The costa beyond this is dark grey, with two inwards-oblique whitish marks before the apex. There is also a round black apical dot. The hindwings are grey, subhyaline in the disc anteriorly.

References

Gelechiinae
Taxa named by Edward Meyrick
Monotypic moth genera
Moths of Africa